Julio Eduardo Hernández Fuentes (born 31 January 1958) is a retired football goalkeeper from El Salvador who was one of the three non-playing members of his country's squad at the 1982 FIFA World Cup in Spain.

International career
Nicknamed Guayo, Hernández represented El Salvador in 5 FIFA World Cup qualification matches.

References

External links
 RSSSF - El Salvador - Record International Players

1958 births
Living people
Salvadoran footballers
El Salvador international footballers
1982 FIFA World Cup players
Association football goalkeepers